Nigel Francis Quashie (born 20 July 1978) is an English-born Scottish former footballer who played more than 300 games as a midfielder in the Football League. Between 2004 and 2006, he represented Scotland, the country of his grandfather, at full international level on 14 occasions.

Personal life
Quashie was born in the London Borough of Southwark to a Ghanaian father and an English mother. He and former wife Joanna had a son, who died shortly after birth, and a daughter. He has a son with partner Kerry Clarke.

Club career

Queens Park Rangers
He began his career in London as a trainee with Queens Park Rangers in August 1995, making his League debut in a 2–1 defeat against Manchester United at Old Trafford a few months later in December 1995. He was used sparingly for the remainder of that campaign, making eleven appearances as QPR were relegated from the Premier League at the end of the 1995–96 season. He made a further 13 appearances in the 1996–97 season before breaking into the first eleven on a regular basis in the 1997–98 season when he made 34 league and cup appearances.

Nottingham Forest
Quashie joined Premier League side Nottingham Forest for £2.5 million at the start of the 1998–99 season but made only 18 appearances as Forest were comfortably relegated. He settled into the team in the 1999–2000 season, making 34 appearances, but was transfer listed by manager, David Platt, at the end of a disappointing season as Forest finished well short of the promotion places. By July, he reportedly had attracted interest from several clubs, including West Bromwich Albion and Birmingham City with Portsmouth understood to have made an offer.

Portsmouth
Quashie joined Portsmouth in August 2000 for a fee worth up to £600,000, signing a three-year contract. He quickly established himself in the first-team, making 37 league and cup appearances in the 2001–02 season as Portsmouth finished in the lower half of the First Division. He made a further 44 appearances in the 2002–03 season and was club vice-captain when Portsmouth won the First Division championship and were promoted to the Premier League. No sooner had he returned from a six-week layoff with a knee injury in December 2003 than he suffered an injury to his opposite knee leading him to miss a further six weeks of the 2003–04 season. However, Quashie remained a first choice player, making 25 appearances as Portsmouth claimed 13th place in the Premier League. Although Quashie was a regular starter in the 2004–05 season and club captain, he had not been offered a new contract despite being out of contract at the end of the season and joined former Portsmouth manager, Harry Redknapp, at Southampton during the January 2005 transfer window.

Southampton
Quashie joined Southampton for a fee of £2.1 million in January 2005, signing a three-and-a-half-year contract. He said, "It's a big move for me and I am happy to be linking up with Harry Redknapp again. I am certain we will stay up – I would not have come here if I had any doubts about that, but we need to get a few results quickly." The chairman of Southampton, Rupert Lowe, said, "Harry really wanted Nigel – he thinks he is a strong character who will add to the dressing room. We are delighted to make him our third signing since Harry arrived." A training ground injury prevented Quashie from making his debut against Liverpool on 22 January 2005 and he did not make his debut until the match against Everton on 6 February.

After the transfer of Jason Dodd, he became the club's captain but he was unable to prevent the Saints being relegated at the end of the 2004–05 season. Despite relegation, Quashie said that he had no regrets over the move to Southampton as he had been unhappy with the way he had been treated at Portsmouth. However, following Redknapp's departure and his replacement with George Burley, Quashie was allowed to leave Southampton in the January 2006 transfer window.

West Bromwich Albion
Quashie joined West Bromwich Albion in January 2006 for £1.2 million, signing a three-and-a-half-year contract. Manager Bryan Robson, "I always liked Nigel when he played for QPR, Portsmouth and Southampton. He is intelligent, has good stamina and is a very good passer of the ball. He has got the experience now of relegation fights and playing in the Premiership. I just feel he will improve our squad." He made his debut for Albion in a 2–0 Premier League win over Blackburn Rovers on 4 February 2006. He was charged with misconduct by the Football Association after being sent off against Middlesbrough three weeks later for alleged use of foul and abusive language towards the referee's assistants as he left the pitch and was given a one-game ban in addition to a four-game ban for the sending off, his second of the season, and a £5,000 fine after admitting misconduct. His only goal for the club came in a 3–1 defeat against Arsenal in April 2006. Albion were relegated at the end of the season. Quashie achieved the rare distinction of being relegated from the Premiership in two successive seasons. Following relegation, Quashie was allowed to leave in the January 2007 transfer window as he expressed a wish to return to the Premier League and manager, Tony Mowbray, wanted to raise some revenue to bring in new players.

West Ham United
Quashie became Alan Curbishley's second signing of the transfer window when he joined West Ham United on a three-and-a-half-year contract for an initial fee of £1.5 million, rising to £1.75 million after West Ham successfully avoided relegation in the 2006–07 season. Curbishley explained that he had signed Quashie "...because he is an experienced player who will add competition to our central midfield positions [...] The competition for places is a factor that will be important to us as we fight to move up the table..." Quashie made his debut against Fulham a few days later and went on to make eight appearances, none of them on the winning side, as West Ham battled against relegation.

A persistent foot injury meant that Quashie did not play a single competitive match during 2007–08. He made his comeback in a friendly match against Queens Park Rangers in August 2008. The signing of Swiss international Valon Behrami in the summer of 2008 and the emergence of academy graduates Jack Collison and Junior Stanislas meant that competition for midfield places was much stiffer. In January 2010 he was released by West Ham and rejoined QPR.

Birmingham City
Quashie trained with Birmingham City of the Championship for several weeks to regain fitness before signing on loan, initially for a month, on 22 October 2008. He went straight into the squad for that day's match against Crystal Palace, and made his debut as a second-half substitute. Despite missing the last game of his initial loan spell through suspension, having been sent off in the match against Charlton Athletic, the loan was extended for a further month, and again for a third and final month, until 17 January 2009. Quashie returned to West Ham on 19 January, having played 11 times for Birmingham.

Wolverhampton Wanderers
Quashie joined Championship side Wolverhampton Wanderers on 22 January 2009 on loan until the end of the season. He made three consecutive appearances for the team before quickly dropping out of contention as the club won promotion to the Premier League as champions.

Milton Keynes Dons
In November 2009 Quashie joined League One side Milton Keynes Dons on loan until 3 January 2010. He made a losing start to his MK Dons career coming on in the first half for Luke Howell in the 4–3 home defeat to Carlisle United on 24 November. Quashie scored his first goal for MK Dons on 12 December in a 2–1 away win against Leyton Orient. In total in seven League games he scored two goals.

Return to Queens Park Rangers
Quashie returned to his first professional club, Queens Park Rangers on 22 January 2010, stating; "It's great to be back home, and I am delighted to be at a club that I love to pieces". He made his second QPR debut in the 5–0 defeat at one of his former clubs, Nottingham Forest. Quashie was released by QPR at the end of the 2009–10 season.

Íþróttafélag Reykjavíkur
On 13 April 2012, Quashie joined 1. deild karla side Íþróttafélag Reykjavíkur on a two-year contract as both a player and as assistant manager to Andri Marteinsson. He is also a coach in the ÍR academy. Quashie made his league debut for ÍR on 12 May 2012 and scored the team's second goal in the 3–2 win against KA. Following the dismissal of manager Andri Marteinsson on 21 August 2012 with ÍR at the bottom of the division, Quashie was appointed to take charge of the team until the end of the 2012 season.

BÍ/Bolungarvík
In January 2013, Quashie signed a 3-year contract with 1. deild karla club BÍ/Bolungarvík. He also served as assistant coach in all three seasons. He retired from playing football following the 2015 season.

International career
After several impressive performances for QPR, Quashie was awarded four England Under-21 and an England 'B' caps. He is eligible to play for the Scottish national football team through a Scottish grandfather and, given the opportunity to play international football for Scotland in April 2004, said "I have been asked to prove my grandfather came from Scotland, but that is no problem. He was born in Glasgow and I'd be very interested in playing for Scotland. I'd never given up hope of forcing my way into the full England set-up but I would consider playing for Scotland."

Quashie switched his allegiance to Scotland and made his international debut against Estonia in May 2004. Quashie thus became only the second black player to represent Scotland (after Andrew Watson in 1881) and the third non white person (after Paul Wilson in 1975). He scored in his second game, a 4–1 win over Trinidad and Tobago, a few days later. Berti Vogts said of him, "Nigel is a fantastic player and a real leader on the pitch. He feels so Scottish and that's great." In total Quashie made 14 appearances for Scotland, scoring one goal.

Career statistics

Club

International appearances

International goals
Scores and results list Scotland's goal tally first.

Portsmouth
FL First Division: 2002–03

Birmingham City
FL Championship: Promotion 2008–09

See also
List of Scotland international footballers born outside Scotland 
List of sportspeople who competed for more than one nation

References

External links

Nigel Quashie profile at whufc.com (West Ham United official website)

1978 births
People from Nunhead
Footballers from the London Borough of Southwark
Living people
Scottish footballers
Scotland international footballers
English footballers
England under-21 international footballers
England B international footballers
British sportspeople of Ghanaian descent
Scottish people of Ghanaian descent
Scottish people of English descent
English people of Scottish descent
English sportspeople of Ghanaian descent
Queens Park Rangers F.C. players
Nottingham Forest F.C. players
Portsmouth F.C. players
Southampton F.C. players
West Bromwich Albion F.C. players
West Ham United F.C. players
Birmingham City F.C. players
Wolverhampton Wanderers F.C. players
Milton Keynes Dons F.C. players
Nigel Quashie
Nigel Quashie
Premier League players
English Football League players
Expatriate footballers in Iceland
Black British sportsmen
Association football midfielders
Sportspeople of Ghanaian descent
Association football coaches